The Women's ski big air competition at the FIS Freestyle Ski and Snowboarding World Championships 2019 was held on February 2, 2019.

Qualification
The qualification was started at 09:40.

Final
The final was started at 19:00.

References

Women's ski big air